Peter Remmel (born 3 February 1954) is a German former swimmer. He competed in the men's 100 metre butterfly at the 1972 Summer Olympics.

References

External links
 

1954 births
Living people
German male swimmers
Olympic swimmers of West Germany
Swimmers at the 1972 Summer Olympics
People from Bottrop
Sportspeople from Münster (region)
20th-century German people
21st-century German people